(born February 10, 1957) is a Japanese illustrator and manga artist. He was born in Kōchi, Kōchi Prefecture on the island of Shikoku in Japan, and now resides in Kyoto. Yamada is known for delicate images reminiscent of suiboku and depiction of fantasy subjects. He is the 1996 Seiun Award winner in art category.

Biography

While he has created many manga, Yamada is widely known as a novel illustrator and as a character designer. As an illustrator his best known works are Fuyumi Ono's Twelve Kingdoms series and Mizuno Ryo's Record of Lodoss War. His character design credits include concepts for the anime series RahXephon as well as a variety of video games. He worked on concept design of the movie Shinobi: Heart Under Blade.

Yamada's character design credits for anime include RahXephon. His work on video games includes Saiyuki: Journey West for PlayStation, various Might and Magic and Wizardry titles for the PC Engine, both entries to Mystic Ark, Enix's role-playing video game for the Super Famicom and PlayStation and character designs for Shinkai Densetsu Meremanoid and Terra Phantastica. Yamada also worked on a game called Chaos Gear and a PC game, Black Rainbow.

Yamada's designs can also be found in Castlevania: Dracula X for the Super NES and in Front Mission 3 for the PlayStation. Yamada has produced many anime artbook compilations.

Yamada drew the manga Record of Lodoss War: The Lady of Pharis in conjunction with writer Ryo Mizuno, and is currently working on an Asian-themed solo manga, Beast of East.

Yamada attracted attention outside Japan through his illustrations of Fuyumi Ono's long-running The Twelve Kingdoms light novel series. He specially designed the rich cover illustrations for the home DVD releases of the anime adaptation of this series. Within Japan he has illustrated covers for numerous translated anthologies of Cthulhu Mythos literature, and is currently working with Kurodahan Press on their translation of a four-volume Japanese anthology of Cthulhu Mythos literature, . Yamada is drawing covers that are exclusive to the English translation.

His work is also seen in the non-verbal theatre show GEAR, in Kyoto. His character designs and aesthetic are the basis for the costume design and set design of GEAR.

Video games
Black Rainbow (PC-98) [1990] - Cover Art, Character Designer
Black Rainbow II (PC-98) [1992] - Cover Art, Character Designer
Might and Magic III: Isles of Terra (PC Engine) [1993] - Cover Art (Japanese Ver.)
Ancient Magic バズー!魔法世界 (Super Famicom) [1993] - Cover Art, Character Designer
Gaiapolis 黄金鷹の剣 (Arcade)  [1993] - Promotional Art
Wizardry I・II (PC Engine) [1993] - Cover Art
Wizardry III・IV (PC Engine) [1994] - Cover Art
疾風魔法大作戦 Kingdom Grandprix (Arcade, Sega Saturn) [1994/1995] - Cover Art (Sega Saturn release), Character Designer
Mystic Ark (Super Famicom) [1995] - Cover Art, Character Designer
悪魔城ドラキュラXX (Super Famicom) [1995] - Cover Art, Character Designer
Terra Phantastica (Sega Saturn) [1996] - Cover Art, Character Designer
Milandra (Super Famicom) [1997] - Cover Art
Front Mission 3 (PlayStation) [1999] - Character Designer
Mystic Ark まぼろし劇場 (PlayStation) [1999] - Cover Art, Character Designer
Meremanoid (PlayStation) [1999] - Cover Art, Character Designer
西遊記 (PlayStation) [1999] - Cover Art, Character Designer
Fire Emblem Heroes (Android, iOS) [2017] - Character Designer (Jagen, Ogma, Zephiel [Binding Blade ver.], Gunter, Bantu, Mila, Gatekeeper)

See also 
 GEAR, theatre show based in Kyoto with design by Akihiro Yamada.

References

Related links
 
 
 

1957 births
Anime character designers
Cthulhu Mythos writers
Video game artists
Living people
People from Kōchi, Kōchi
Manga artists from Kōchi Prefecture